Todd Carmichael is an American entrepreneur, adventure traveler, philanthropist, television personality, author, inventor, and producer.

Carmichael is the CEO and co-founder for Philadelphia-based La Colombe. He is the first American to complete a solo trek across Antarctica to the South Pole, on foot with no assistance, capturing the World Speed Record with a total travel time of 39 days, 7 hours and 49 minutes. Recorded footage of his trek later became an award-winning documentary entitled Race to the Bottom of the Earth (2010) that was aired on the National Geographic Channel. With his World Record accomplishment, he also raised thousands for one of his numerous philanthropic projects.

Carmichael was named Esquire Magazine's "American of the Year" and Philadelphia Magazine's "Person of the Year" in 2011 and later ranked #1 by Food Republic for the most influential figure in its Coffee Power Ranking. He is currently the host of Travel Channel's Dangerous Grounds and Uncommon Grounds.

Early life and education
Todd Carmichael was born on August 30, 1963 outside Spokane, Washington. He has three sisters. Carmichael completed his first marathon at age 15. His mother eventually moved the family to Spokane's South Hill so that he could attend Joel E. Ferris High School, which was home, at the time, to the region's best cross-country team. From 1981 to 1982, he was part of Ferris' state championship squad. He graduated from the high school in 1982, and received a distance running scholarship to the University of Washington, where he studied business and went on to work in accounting for Ernst & Young. He also ran his first ultramarathon at age 20.

While at college in Seattle, Carmichael started working in the warehouse of Starbucks. Carmichael also met his longtime friend and future business partner, La Colombe co-founder Jean Philippe Iberti, in 1985.

Career

La Colombe
In 1993, Todd Carmichael reconnected with Iberti, and returned to the U.S. in 1994, settling down in Philadelphia, PA in mid-January of that year. The two self-described coffee-geeks felt that the coffees they would get at restaurants to end their meals would often be disappointing, tarnishing their overall experience of what had been an enjoyable meal. So they set out to create what they would refer to as "culinary coffee," and felt that the city was on the cusp of a culinary renaissance.

Carmichael and Iberti opened La Colombe Torrefaction, their first European-style café in May 1994 on 19th Street near Philadelphia's Rittenhouse Square Park. In the beginning, they would roast their own unique blends in the back of their café, and after struggling at first like most startup businesses, the demand for their coffee among restaurants began to increase exponentially. In December 1994, they opened a roastery in a warehouse in the city's Port Richmond neighborhood. Now, La Colombe is served in some of the most elite restaurants throughout the U.S. with top-rated cafés located in Philadelphia, New York City, Chicago, Washington, D.C., and Seoul, South Korea and plans to open nearly 100 more establishments throughout the U.S. within the next five years.

Haiti Coffee Academy
In late 2009, Todd Carmichael began to formulate his idea to create a Southern blend that would later become known as La Colombe's Louisiane, which he felt needed to be made with coffee from Haiti. Once the wealthiest colony in the Western Hemisphere, producing 40 percent of the world's coffee, the Caribbean country had become, at the time, the poorest as a result of political upheaval, riots, wars, natural disasters, and embargoes that were sanctioned upon the nation. By 2011, there was not a single Haitian coffee bean found in the U.S. so Carmichael set out to find the coffee and bring it back.

During his quest, he was accompanied by a camera crew, who were filming him for a series that would later become Travel Channel's Dangerous Grounds. While hunting for his elusive Haitian bean, he came upon a farm that inspired him to want to help Haiti improve its coffee farming methods. He was later approached by the Clinton Foundation to collaborate on a coffee project to aid in the revitalization of Haiti's ailing economy. In August 2012, the Foundation committed $350,000 to the project, and with the assistance of Conor Murphy, a business development advisor in Haiti, La Colombe worked out an agreement to lease for 10 years the farm that Carmichael initially came upon during his first episode of Dangerous Grounds, which is where the Haiti Coffee Academy currently resides. In August 2013, the academy officially registered as a private company in Haiti, and new Arabica seeds arrived from Brazil to be planted. In February 2014, President Bill Clinton, Todd Carmichael and J.P. Iberti visited the Haiti Coffee Academy for its official launch.

La Colombe Distilling
While on his numerous trips around the world sourcing coffee for La Colombe, Carmichael noticed everywhere that he went farmers would have a makeshift still, producing their own moonshine while also harvesting coffee. When La Colombe Torrefaction reached its nineteenth year of existence, Carmichael and Iberti started thinking about their twentieth anniversary and what new products they should launch. It was on a trip to Madagascar when a farmer handed Todd Carmichael some "sugar juice" that he said to himself: "I could make a better one, and we should have our own moonshine too." At the time, Bickley and Iberti were frequently traveling in and out of Haiti. Noticing the vast amount of sugar cane growing in its field, they realized that exporting the plant could be another way La Colombe would be able to help the Haitian economy, so the "moonshine" project became focused on rum, which lead to the inception of La Colombe Distillery.

Travel 
In 2000, Carmichael decided to take a three-month sabbatical from the coffee industry and his business, La Colombe Torrefaction. He arranged to be dropped off on Nagigia, a tiny island in the South Pacific with only about 150 inhabitants. "The idea was to go back in time… to learn from the indigenous people there how to survive," said Carmichael. He spent two and a half months surfing, spearing fish and building a hut. It became a turning point in his life. "During that time, I thought, 'You know what, it's very, very clear for you, my friend: Adventure and endurance is just part of your life. And it's time you take it more seriously.'"

On December 21, 2008, Carmichael became the first American to cross from the shores of Antarctica to the South Pole on foot and unassisted. In doing so, he broke the World Speed Record with a total travel time of 39 days, 7 hours and 49 minutes. He has also traveled across large parts of the Sahara on foot as well as the Gobi, Namib and others, and explored the Congolese jungle and Zimbabwe's scrub plains. In September 2010, he attempted to make the first solo self-contained trek across Death Valley, but was forced to abort the mission after a malfunction with his equipment.

Philanthropy
Todd Carmichael claims he has always been an advocate for social change. "It's not so much about being a philanthropist; it's simply about being a good neighbor," proclaimed Carmichael. On his World Record-breaking adventure to the South Pole, he raised more than $250,000 for Orangutan Foundation International, a nonprofit organization dedicated to the conservation of wild orangutans and their rainforest habitat. He has collaborated with actor Leonardo DiCaprio to create La Colombe's Lyon blend, with proceeds going to the funding of wildlife protection, forest preservation, clean-water projects, disaster relief and climate-change research around the globe via the Leonardo DiCaprio Foundation.

Working with ECHOES Around the World in Uganda and Wide Horizons For Children in Ethiopia, he has actively engaged in bettering the lives of hundreds of orphaned children living in Africa through Project Afrique, a natural extension of his coffee work, made possible through the sales of La Colombe's Afrique blend and additional funding from the coffee-roasting company and his partner, J.P. Iberti. Carmichael is also assisting to bring safe drinking water into coffee-growing regions and throughout the world, in collaboration with the organizations Coffee For Water and charity: water.

And of course, there is his work with the Clinton Foundation, whom he has partnered with to develop Haiti's first and only coffee academy, which is helping to revitalize the coffee industry in the impoverished country. Carmichael is also a supporter of the Rainforest Alliance, an organization dedicated to conserving biodiversity and ensuring sustainable livelihoods by transforming land-use practices, business practices and consumer behavior.

Television and film
During his journey across Antarctica, he maintained a video log of his progress, which was later formatted into a documentary, Race to the Bottom of the Earth (2010), which appeared on National Geographic. It was also picked as the winner of the "Best Documentary Feature" category at the Los Angeles Cinema Festival of Hollywood Winter 2011, and became an Official Selection at the Newport Beach Film Festival in 2011. He is currently the host of his own reality/adventure series on the Travel Channel entitled Dangerous Grounds, where he travels to the most remote and renowned coffee-producing regions of the world, sourcing for La Colombe. The television show premiered on November 5, 2012, and immediately received favorable ratings and reviews. Dangerous Grounds is on its third season of production, which premiered on February 26, 2015.

Writing
Carmichael was a prolific contributor to Esquire Magazine "Eat Like a Man" blog, where he covered subjects mainly related to coffee, its industry, and his travels in Haiti and the country's issues. He has also written for Huffington Post regarding topics about the environment and animal rights.

Personal life
Todd Carmichael is married to singer-songwriter Lauren Hart, the daughter of the Philadelphia Flyers and Lehigh Valley Phantoms announcer Gene Hart. They had met at an interview about his upcoming Antarctica exhibition, at the time, for NBC 10's The 10! Show, where she was the host. He called Hart during his adventure from the ice to ask her on their first date, and less than a month later, they were engaged. They have three daughters and one son, all of whom were adopted from Ethiopia. Carmichael shared, "Adoption isn't so much about doing something good for someone or charity - nothing like that. It's about building a family."

Accolades and praise
Todd Carmichael was named Esquire Magazine "American of the Year" and Philadelphia Magazine "Person of the Year" in 2011. He is currently the host of Travel Channel's Dangerous Grounds, where his globetrotting adventures in search of the finest coffees in the world are recorded and broadcast globally. With The Clinton Foundation, Carmichael is one of the co-founders of the Haiti Coffee Academy, created to help revitalize the country's once prominent coffee industry. In 2014, he entered the Specialty Coffee Association of America and the Barista Guild of America's U.S. Brewers Cup competition for the first time, and won the Northeast Regionals with a "full immersion - double suspended filtration" method. He also placed runner-up at the national competition in Seattle, where he unveiled and used the prototype of his experimental brewing contraption, called "The Dragon." It is a manual coffee-brewing device that he invented, integrating the pour-over concept with elements of the classic siphon. That same year, Food Republic ranked him #1 in its "Coffee Power Ranking."

References

External links
 Todd Carmichael Home Page
 La Colombe Home Page
 
 Todd Carmichael's Expedition Earth Blog
 Race to the Bottom of the Earth
 Todd Carmichael Interview After Reaching South Pole
 Pacific Northwest Inlander Article by Jacob H. Fries
 Todd Carmichael, American
 Food Republic Coffee Power Ranking

American explorers
Living people
1963 births
Businesspeople from Spokane, Washington
American expatriates in Haiti